Polumgla, also known as Twilight, is a 2005 Russian film, directed by Artem Antonov, in his directorial debut, at the age of 26.  The film was written by Igor Bolgarin and Viktor Smirnov, and stars Yuri Tarasov, Sergey Gryaznov and Anastasiya Sheveleva.

Synopsis

The film concerns the relationship between German prisoners of war and local women in the remote Soviet village of Polumgla, located in Archangel province. In the winter of 1944 in Polumgla, the locals consist almost entirely of women, since most of the men have been mobilised to military service.

The film focuses on the circumstances of a young Lieutenant in the Russian army, Grigori Anokhin, played by Yuri Tarasov, who is stuck in a sanatorium but eager to return to the front in order “to kill the fascists”, as he says. Traumatized by witnessing the massacre of his comrades, he has taken to drink and he is ready to exact revenge. His attempts to return to the front, however, are frustrated, when he is assigned a different mission. With a team of soldiers unfit for duty at the front, he is ordered to take a group of fifteen German prisoners and their commanding officer to the remote village of Polumgla, to construct a radio tower for use as an airplane beacon.

With the ability to communicate only in rudimentary phrases and left to their own devices far away from the war, the villagers, soldiers and the German prisoners slowly begin to coexist peacefully.

The film ends with a detachment of NKVD soldiers arriving and declaring that the war is over, and that the radio tower the German prisoners of war have been working on for a year is no longer of any use. All of the German prisoners of war, many of whom have become intimate with the village women, are marched off into the woods and executed.

Cast

Yuri Tarasov  Grigori Anokhin 
Sergey Gryaznov  Chumachenko 
Anastasiya Sheveleva  Palashka 
Martin Jackowski  Hans 
Lidiya Bairashevskaya  Feonia 
Christian Sengewald  Peter 
Natalya Burmistrova  Evdokiya 
Vitaly Kovalenko  Mitrofan 
Kira Kreylis-Petrova  Lukeriya 
Evgeniy Merkurev  Old man Severianych 
Aleksandr Stekolnikov  Radio operator 
Nikolay Spiridonov  Keshka 
Anatoliy Gorin  The invalid, Ignashka 
Vladimir Kolesnikov  Convoy guard 1 
Johannes Rapp  Captain Bulbach 
Nikita Loginov  Convoy guard 2 
Aleksandr Balsanov  Vitka the sailor 
Sergey Losev  Major 
Sergei Kozyrev  Batyuk 
Pyotr Korolyov  Railway worker 
Ekaterina Frolova  Nurse  
Margarita Ivanova

References

2005 films
Russian war drama films